This list of television acting awards is an index to articles about awards for acting in television shows. The list includes general awards and awards for best supporting actor and actress.
It excludes awards for Best Actress and Best Actor, which are covered by separate lists.

General

Best Supporting Actor

Best Supporting Actress

See also

 Lists of awards
 Lists of acting awards
 List of television awards
 List of television awards for Best Actress 
 List of television awards for Best Actor

References

 
 
 
 
television